James B. Culbertson (born 27 May 1938) served as the United States Ambassador to the Netherlands until 2009. Appointed by President George W. Bush, Culbertson was commissioned as ambassador on July 10, 2008. He presented his credentials to Queen Beatrix on August 13, 2008.

Early life
Culbertson was born in Goldsboro, North Carolina, on May 27, 1938. In 1960, he graduated from  The Citadel with a Bachelor of Arts degree in political science. After graduation he served as an  Intelligence officer for the  U.S. Army from 1960 to 1962.

Private sector

In 1974, he founded Financial Computing and served as CEO, until his retirement in 2000. Culbertson served on the North Carolina Banking Commission from 1973 to 1979. He also served on the North Carolina Board of Economic Development from 1985 to 1993. From 1988 to 1993, Culbertson was a member of the National Federation of Independent Businessmen. Additionally, He has been a member of the Fund for American Studies Board of Trustees, since 1988, as well as a member of the American Battle Monuments Commission, since 2005.

Political career
Culbertson first visited the Netherlands in 1970, as a member of The Atlantic Council of Young Political Leaders, serving as a board member from 1973 to 1979.

Culbertson has been an active member of the American Republican Party for many years, acting as a fundraiser in the state of North Carolina. He has served on a number of State and National committees. In 2000, Culbertson was the Co-Chairman for the North Carolina Campaign for George W. Bush's presidency. In 2005, he was one of eight Co-Chairs for President Bush's Inauguration.

Culbertson's family consists of his wife, a daughter, and two grandsons.

External links
United States embassy in The Hague: Ambassador's biography
White House Personnel Announcement
The News & Observer: Bush donor to get ambassador nomination

References

Biography: James B. Culbertson; U.S. Department of State; Archive; August 13, 2008

Living people
American computer businesspeopleada
Ambassadors of the United States to the Netherlands
1938 births
People from Goldsboro, North Carolina
The Citadel, The Military College of South Carolina alumni

20th-century American businesspeople